The Battle of Pando was a minor military engagement during the Portuguese conquest of the Banda Oriental in what is now the nation of Uruguay.

References

Pando
Pando
Pando
1818 in Brazil
1818 in Uruguay